The women's 100 metre backstroke event at the 2012 Summer Olympics took place on 29–30 July at the London Aquatics Centre in London, United Kingdom.

At only 17 years of age, U.S. teenage sensation Missy Franklin, billed as "Missy the Missile" by her fans, stormed home on the final stretch to pick up her first ever Olympic gold medal in swimming. Trailing behind at the halfway turn, she pulled away from a tightly packed field with a more destructive force to hit the wall first in an American record of 58.33. Australia's Emily Seebohm started the race with a marginal lead over the rest of the field, but faded down the stretch to settle only for the silver in 58.68. Meanwhile, Japan's Aya Terakawa grabbed the bronze in an Asian record of 58.83, holding off the fast-charging Russian swimmer Anastasia Zuyeva to a fourth spot in 59.00.

Great Britain's Gemma Spofforth, the reigning world record holder, finished fifth in 59.20, while China's Zhao Jing (59.23), Australia's Belinda Hocking (59.29) and Zhao's teammate Fu Yuanhui (1:00.50) rounded out the field.

Earlier in the prelims, Seebohm blitzed the field from heat four to lead all swimmers with a sterling Olympic and Oceanian record in 58.23, shaving 0.54 seconds off the standard set by Zimbabwe's Kirsty Coventry in Beijing four years earlier. Coventry, double Olympic silver medalist, missed a chance to reach the final roster with a fourteenth-place effort (1:00.39) from the semifinals.

Records
Prior to this competition, the existing world and Olympic records were as follows.

The following records were established during the competition:

Results

Heats

Semifinals

Semifinal 1

Semifinal 2

Final

References

External links
NBC Olympics Coverage

Women's 00100 metre backstroke
2012 in women's swimming
Women's events at the 2012 Summer Olympics